Mecas humeralis is a species of longhorn beetles found in Mexico. It was described by Chemsak and Linsley in 1973.

References

Saperdini
Beetles described in 1973